Prairie Hill can be any of the following places in the United States:

Prairie Hill, Missouri
Prairie Hill, Texas:
Prairie Hill, Limestone County, Texas
Prairie Hill, Washington County, Texas